Sir Henry Bouverie Paulet St John-Mildmay, 5th Baronet (1810 – 16 July 1902), of Dogmersfield Park, Hampshire, was an English landowner and British Army officer.

Biography
St John-Mildmay was born in 1810, the son of Sir Henry St John-Mildmay, 4th Baronet and Charlotte Bouverie. He succeeded his father as baronet in 1848.

He was commissioned an officer in the 2nd Dragoon Guards, where he advanced to major before he resigned. He was later Commanding Officer and later Honorary Colonel of the North Hampshire Yeomanry. Serving as High Sheriff of Hampshire in 1862, he was also a Deputy Lieutenant of the county.

St John-Mildmay married, in 1851, Honourable Helena Shaw Lefevre, daughter of Charles Shaw-Lefevre, 1st Viscount Eversley by his wife Emma Laura Whitbread. Lady St John-Mildmay died in 1897. They had seven children, of whom two daughters died young:
Jane Emma (1851–1928), who married James Martin Carr-Lloyd.
Sir Henry Paulet (1853–1916)
Helena Charlotte (1854–1867)
Laura Cathrine (1856–1866)
Constance Mary (1859–1930), who married Sir John Arthur Beach Wellington, KCB
Sir Gerald Anthony Shaw-Lefevre-St John-Mildmay, 7th Baronet (1860–1929)
Carew Hervey Mary (1863–1937); married Elizabeth Roper, daughter of Sir Henry Roper (a great-grandson of Henry Roper, 8th Baron Teynham and Lady Anne Lennard, daughter of Thomas Lennard, 1st Earl of Essex) and Charlotte Lydia Pleydell-Bouverie, granddaughter of Jacob Pleydell-Bouverie, 2nd Earl of Radnor. They had six children.

Sir Henry died at Dogmersfield Park on 16 July 1902, and was succeeded by his eldest son Henry Paulet St John-Mildmay.

References

1810 births
1902 deaths
Baronets in the Baronetage of Great Britain
People from Hart District
2nd Dragoon Guards (Queen's Bays) officers
High Sheriffs of Hampshire
Deputy Lieutenants of Hampshire
Mildmay